Lize Spit (born 1988, in Viersel) is a Flemish Belgian writer. Her first novel, Het smelt, won several awards, including the De Bronzen Uil award, and has been translated into French. Her second novel, Ik ben er niet is launched on 10 December 2020

Biography 
Spit grew up in the Belgian De Kempen region. She studied in Brussels at the Royal Institute for Theatre, Cinema and Sound (RITCS), where she was awarded a master's degree in scriptwriting. In 2013, she won the Write Now! award. After having written her first novel Het smelt, she won the De Bronzen Uil award for this book in 2016. After gaining popularity with this book, she became a columnist for the De Morgen newspaper until 2017.

References 

1988 births
Living people
20th-century Belgian writers